Chiesa di San Pietro dei Pellegrini is a church in Milan, Italy. 

Pietro